Treis Elies is a village in Cyprus, which is also known as Triselyes, Tris Eliæs, Tris Eliaes, Üçzeytinler, Uczeytinler. Nearby cities include Agios Dimitrios to the east, Lemithou to the north, and Kaminaria to the south. The name means: Three Olive Trees.
An article on the village was published in the newspaper Phileleftheros of 20.3.2014. The title of the article is: "Τρεις Ελιες: Μια ηλικιωμένη τέτοια μέρα ψήνει καφέ". The English translation of the title is: Treis Elies: An old lady prepares coffee this day. One photo of the coffee shop (kafenes in Greek) keeper knitting with her smili (needle work) and three other photos at the coffee shop decorate the article. The article is signed by Anastasia Siakalli. More information in the book "Τρεις Ελιές: Ταξίδι στην Ανοιξη" by Etahn Hubbard, 2013.

External links
Official Website

References

  Presentation of the book: 'Treis Elies- A journey in Spring last week' by Ethan Hubbard at http://www.cyprusnewsreport.com/?q=node/7483

official website=
http://www.triselies.org

ΕΛιες

Communities in Limassol District